Károly Fellinger (born 1963) is a Hungarian poet, writer, local historian living in Slovakia.

Life and works 
Born in Bratislava, Károly Fellinger lives in Jelka since his childhood. During his high school years in the Hungarian Academic Grammar School of Galanta, he was the editor in chief of the school journal and the founding editor of the quarterly review Words of Jelka (Jelčianské slovo) between 1993 and 2003. He used to work as an agronomist, now he runs his own smallholding. He has published 20 books in Hungarian so far. Most of them are collections of poems for adults and children, a village monograph and tales. As a mythographer, he collected the tales and legends of Mátyusföld (region of the Mátyus, Matúšova zem). His volumes of poetry have been published in English, German, Romanian, Serbian, French, Russian, Slovak and Turkish. He has been awarded the Golden Opus Prize of the SZMÍT (Hungarian Writers' Association of Slovakia) twice and the Imre Forbáth Prize for the best collection of poetry written in Hungarian in 2014. In 2013, he was the winner of the Bóbita poetry contest of the Hungarian Writers' Association. He was a deputy of the municipal council for twenty years and the deputy mayor for years.

In 2014, his volume of selected poetry was translated in English and published in Canada. His poem was featured in the international anthology Poems for the Hazara in 2014. In the same year, Károly Pallai devoted an English language analysis to the poetry of Fellinger. His first collection of poems in French was published by the prestigious Éditions du Cygne in Paris (Bétonnière ivre, 2015). In 2016, he received the prestigious Madách Award of the Slovakian Literary Fund for his collection of poems Különbejárat. In 2016, he was the only Slovakian author to be published in the 2015 edition of the World Poetry Yearbook (China). In 2016, his poems were selected and published in the yearly anthology of the Hungarian Writers' Association of Slovakia. In 2016, his poems were published in Spain (Dios está ausente) and in Canada (Sieve of Light in the Pine Forest), and a volume of his best poems (Fellinger Károly legszebb versei) was also released.

In 2017, his tales were published in a bilingual, Hungarian-English edition (A Kincsesláda-The Treasure Chest). His poems were featured in Empty Mirror and Setu (United States), Sipay (Seychelles), A New Ulster (Northern Ireland), Ygdrasil (Canada) and in the prestigious Belgian review Traversées. In 2017, he received the Tibor Simkó Prize of the Hungarian Writers' Association of Slovakia for his collection of tales Ilka vára. In the same year, he was awarded the Medal of the Chairman of the Trnava Self-Governing Region for his contribution to culture. His new poems were published under the title Köti a sötétséget by Media Nova and his second collection of poems in French appeared in Paris (À l'affût de Dieu, Éditions du Cygne). His poem "Elbocsátó" was translated in English by Károly Sándor Pallai and published in the international poetic anthology Amaravati Poetic Prism (India).

He is a member of the Hungarian Writers' Association of Slovakia and of the Hungarian Writers' Association.

Literary prizes 
 2017: Medal of the Chairman of the Trnava Self-Governing Region for cultural contribution
 2017: Tibor Simkó Prize (Hungarian Writers' Association of Slovakia)
 2016: Madách Award (Literary Fund of Slovakia)
 2014: Imre Forbáth Prize (Hungarian Writers' Association of Slovakia)
 2013: Bóbita Poetry Prize (Hungarian Writers' Association)
 2011: Golden Opus Prize (Hungarian Writers' Association of Slovakia)
 2010: Golden Opus Prize (Hungarian Writers' Association of Slovakia)

Major works 
2018: Szimering, Kalligram Kiadó, Bratislava, Slovakia
2018: Hullámvasút, Vámbéry Polgári Társulás (poems in Hungarian), Media Nova M, Dunajská Streda, Slovakia
2018: Mindjárt gondoltam, Vámbéry Polgári Társulás (poems in Hungarian), Media Nova M, Dunajská Streda, Slovakia
2017: ΦΩΣ ΣΤΙΣ ΠΕΥΚΟΒΕΛΟΝΕΣ poetry by ΚΑΡΟΛΟΣ ΦΕΛΙΝΓΚΕΡ (poems in Greek), OSTRIA, Athens, Greece.
2017: À l'affût de Dieu (poems in French), Éditions du Cygne, Paris, France
2017: Köti a sötétséget (poems in Hungarian), Media Nova M, Dunajská Streda, Slovakia
2017: A Kincsesláda – The Treasure Chest (tales in Hungarian-English bilingual edition), AB-ART, Bratislava, Slovakia
2016: Fellinger Károly legszebb versei (poems in Hungarian), AB-ART, Ekecs, Slovakia
2016: Sieve of Light in the Pine Forest (poems in English), Ekstasis Editions, Victoria, British Columbia, Canada
2016: Dios está ausente (poems in Spanish), Luhu Editorial, Alcoy, Spain
2016: Ilka vára, Vámbéry Polgári Társulás, Dunajská Streda, Slovakia
2016: Kéreggyűjtés (poems in Hungarian), AB-ART, Ekecs, Slovakia
2015: Különbejárat (poems in Hungarian), Media Nova M, Dunajská Streda, Slovakia
2015: Pokora (poems in Slovak), Hungarian Writers' Association of Slovakia, Dunajská Streda, Slovakia
2015: Bétonnière ivre (poems in French), Éditions du Cygne, Paris, France
2015: Kincsesláda (tales), AB-ART, Ekecs, Slovakia
2015: Zavesa iz lucsej szveta (poems in Russian), Vest-Konszalting, Moscow, Russia
2015: Tevazu (poems in Turkish), Siirden Yayincilik, Istanbul, Turkey
2014: Din cartea uitarii (poetry in Romanian), Tipo Moldova, Iași, Romania
2014: Humility (poetry in English), Libros Libertad, Surrey, Canada
2014: Jancsi és Juliska (poems), AB-ART, Ekecs, Slovakia
2014: Csigalépcső (selected poems for children), AB-ART, Ekecs, Slovakia
2013: Poniznost (poetry in Serbian), Umetnicka Scena Siveri Janos, Mužlja, Serbia
2013: Demut (poetry in German), Windrose, Frauenkirchen, Austria
2013: Morzsabál (poems for children), Lilium Aurum, Dunajská Streda, Slovakia
2013: Alázat (selected poems), AB-ART, Ekecs, Slovakia
2012: Rész és egész (poetry), Lilium Aurum, Dunajská Streda, Slovakia
2011: Mákom van (poems for children), Lilium Aurum, Dunajská Streda, Slovakia
2011: Csomagmegőrző (selected poems), Mosonvármegye Könyvkiadó, Mosonmagyaróvár
2010: Dióbölcső, mákfejcsörgő (poems for children), Lilium Aurum, Dunajská Streda, Slovakia
2009: Hajléktalan búzavirág (tales and legends), Lilium Aurum, Dunajská Streda, Slovakia
2008: Szélkergető kerek köpeny (poems for children), Lilium Aurum, Dunajská Streda, Slovakia
2006: Fűhárfa (poems for children), Lilium Aurum, Dunajská Streda, Slovakia
2004: Fészek az égen (poetry), Lilium Aurum, Dunajská Streda, Slovakia
1997: Jóka-nevezetességek, Honismereti Kiskönyvtár, Komárno, Slovakia
1997: Égig érő vadkörtefák (tales and poems for children), Lilium Aurum, Dunajská Streda, Slovakia
1996: Csendélet halottakkal (poetry), Lilium Aurum, Dunajská Streda, Slovakia
1991: Áramszünet (poetry), Madách, Bratislava, Slovakia

References 

1963 births
Living people
21st-century Hungarian poets
Hungarians in Slovakia
Writers from Bratislava